Laken Tomlinson (born February 9, 1992) is an American football offensive guard for the New York Jets of the National Football League (NFL). He played college football at Duke. He was drafted by the Detroit Lions in the first round of the 2015 NFL Draft.

Early years
Tomlinson was born in Savanna-la-Mar, Jamaica and moved to Chicago, Illinois in March 2003. He grew up in the Rogers Park neighborhood and attended Lane Technical College Prep High School, where he was a two-sport star in both football and track. He was an All-state selection as a senior by both the Illinois High School Football Coaches Association and Chicago Tribune. He was named the team MVP as a senior. He was a two-time All-city selection. He was also a four-time first-team All-conference selection. He helped lead his high school team to the 2008 Chicago Public League football championship.

In addition, Tomlinson lettered in track & field at Lane. At the 2009 Chicago Public League T&F Championship, he placed first in the discus (140-06 or 42.9m) and second in the shot put. In the 2009 Illinois 3A State T&F Championship meet, he threw personal-bests of 43.01 meters (141-1) in the discus throw and 14.58 meters (47-7) in the shot put to place 17th and 22nd, respectively, in the preliminary heats.

College career
Tomlinson attended Duke University from 2010 to 2014. He became a starter his freshman season and started 52 games during his collegiate career. As a senior, he was named an All-American by Walter Camp Football Foundation (WCFF). He was named the men's ACC Athlete of the Year by winning the Anthony J. McKevlin Award in 2015.

Professional career

Detroit Lions
Tomlinson was drafted in the first round with the 28th overall pick by the Detroit Lions in the 2015 NFL Draft. He was the first Duke player to be selected in the first round of an NFL Draft since Mike Junkin in 1987.

San Francisco 49ers

On August 31, 2017, Tomlinson was traded to the San Francisco 49ers for a 2019 fifth-round draft pick. After missing the season opener, Tomlinson started the next 15 games at left guard in 2017.

On May 2, 2018, the 49ers declined the fifth-year option on Tomlinson's contract, making him a free agent in 2019. However on June 22, 2018, Tomlinson signed a three-year, $18 million extension with the 49ers with $10 million guaranteed.

New York Jets
On March 17, 2022, Tomlinson signed a three-year contract with the New York Jets.

References

External links
Duke Blue Devils bio

1992 births
Living people
All-American college football players
American football offensive guards
Detroit Lions players
Duke Blue Devils football players
Jamaican players of American football
People from Westmoreland Parish
Players of American football from Chicago
San Francisco 49ers players
New York Jets players